Held on 13 May each year, the Abbotsbury Garland Day celebrations have taken place in the Dorset village of Abbotsbury since about the early 19th century. They were first described in the edition of John Hutchins' History of Dorset published in 1867. The custom involves the making of garlands by the children of the village. Originally only the children of local fishermen took part. The garlands were blessed in a church service and some were then rowed out to sea to be tossed into the water. The children would then spend the rest of the day playing on the beach. From around the time of the First World War the custom changed somewhat in that children of non-fishermen started to take part. This was probably due to the decline of the local fishing industry. The village school gave the children a day's holiday and they would set about constructing two garlands, one of wild flowers and the other of garden flowers. These were held aloft on poles and paraded from house to house in the village with the intention of collecting money which the children would keep. Later in the day older children who had been at school in nearby Weymouth would arrive home and make a more elaborate garland which would also be taken around the houses. From after the First World War two garlands would be placed on the local war memorial.

The Abbotsbury village school closed in 1981 and the children no longer get a day's holiday. This has led to the celebrations taking place in the evening or on the nearest Saturday. However, a determination amongst the villagers has ensured that this English tradition survives, albeit in a form slightly different from the original.

References

Festivals in Dorset
Dorset folklore
Recurring events with year of establishment missing